The Diocese of Clonfert may refer to:

 Diocese of Clonfert (Roman Catholic)
 Diocese of Limerick and Killaloe (Church of Ireland)